217th Division may refer to:

 217th Division (People's Republic of China)
 217th Infantry Division (Wehrmacht)
 217th Rifle Division

Military units and formations disambiguation pages